Events from the year 1940 in Denmark.

Incumbents
 Monarch – Christian X
 Prime minister – Thorvald Stauning

Events
9 April – Operation Weserübung takes place, beginning the occupation of Denmark by Nazi Germany.
 16 April – Princess Margrethe, the future Queen Margrethe II, is born to Crown Prince Frederick and Crown Princess Ingrid of Sweden.

Sports

Badminton
 7 November – Lillerød Badminton Club is founded in Lillerød

Football
 Kjøbenhavns Boldklub wins their eighth Danish football championship by winning the 1939–40 Danish Championship League.

Births
 29 March – Allan Botschinsky, jazz trumpeter (died 2020)
 16 April – Princess Margrethe, the future Queen Margrethe II
 3 December – Palle Jacobsen, ballet dancer (died 2009)

Deaths
 28 January – Heinrich Dohm, painter of portraits, genre works and religious paintings (born 1875)
 13 March – Gustav Frederik Holm, Arctic explorer, naval officer (born 1849)
 25 May – Marie Krøyer, painter (born 1867)
 10 December – Christian Schrøder, film actor (born 1869)
 19 December – Charlotte Norrie, nurse and women's rights activist (born 1855)

References

 
Denmark
Years of the 20th century in Denmark
1940s in Denmark
1940 in Europe